Kevin Hagen (April 3, 1928 – July 9, 2005) was an American actor best known for his role as Dr. Hiram Baker on NBC's Little House on the Prairie.

Early life
Hagen was born in Chicago, Illinois, to professional ballroom dancers, Haakon Olaf Hagen and Marvel Lucile Wadsworth. After his father deserted the family, Hagen was raised by his mother, grandmother, and aunts. As a 15-year-old, he relocated to Portland, Oregon, where one of his aunts had taken a teaching job. 

Hagen attended Portland's Jefferson High School. His family returned to Chicago, and he attended Oregon State University in Corvallis and the University of Southern California in Los Angeles, California, from which he received a degree in international relations. 

Hagen spent a year in law school at the University of California, Los Angeles, and was employed by the U.S. State Department in West Germany then spent two years in the United States Navy. He also taught ballroom dancing for Arthur Murray. At age 27, Hagen was spotted in a production of Eugene O'Neill's Desire Under the Elms and given a guest-starring role on the classic 1950s police series Dragnet, starring Jack Webb.

Acting roles

Hagen's first regular role on a series was in 1958 playing John Colton, the city administrator of New Orleans in the CBS Western Yancy Derringer.

On April 29, 1962, Hagen was cast in the episode "Cort" of Lawman.

Hagen guest-starred on Gunsmoke, The Big Valley, Bonanza, Laramie, Have Gun - Will Travel, Mannix, The Time Tunnel, and Perry Mason. Who made three appearances, in 1958 he played as Sgt. Burke in "The Case of the Sardonic Sergeant", in 1965 he played as murderer Jacob Leonard in "The Case of the Gambling Lady", seven months later he played as Samuel Carleton in "The Case of the Fugitive Fraulein". He appeared as Inspector Dobbs Kobick in nine episodes of Land of the Giants from 1968 to 1970.

Other appearances included Tales of Wells Fargo, The Untouchables, Bat Masterson, Riverboat, Wagon Train, Outlaws, Straightaway, GE True, Hawaiian Eye, Voyage to the Bottom of the Sea, The Twilight Zone, Daniel Boone, Blue Light, Mission: Impossible, Rawhide, 77 Sunset Strip, M*A*S*H, The Rifleman, Lancer, The Virginian, The Guns of Will Sonnett, The Cowboys, Lost in Space, The Silent Force, Sara, Quincy, M.E., Simon and Simon, and Knots Landing.

Hagen played a Confederate renegade who kills James Stewart's son and daughter-in-law in the 1965 film Shenandoah. His most famous role was Doc Baker on Little House on the Prairie.

Personal life
Hagen was married to actress Susanne Cramer until her death in 1969.

In 1992, Hagen moved to Grants Pass in southwestern Oregon where he performed in concerts, dinner theaters, and on stage in Medford, Ashland, and Grants Pass, including the one-man show A Playful Dose of Prairie Wisdom.

In 2004, Hagen was diagnosed with esophageal cancer. He died on July 9, 2005, at his home in Grants Pass. Hagen was survived by his son, Kristopher, and his wife, Jan, whom he married in 1993.

Filmography

References

External links

 Series-80 - Biography
 TV Land - Little House on the Prairie

American male film actors
American male television actors
Male actors from Chicago
Male actors from Portland, Oregon
People from Grants Pass, Oregon
Male actors from Los Angeles
1928 births
2005 deaths
Deaths from esophageal cancer
Oregon State University alumni
UCLA School of Law alumni
USC School of International Relations alumni
Deaths from cancer in Oregon
United States Navy sailors
20th-century American male actors